Ovartaci was the artistic name of the Danish visual artist Louis Marcussen (1894 – 1985). In 1923, Ovartaci emigrated to Argentina for six years for work, along the way rambling and experimenting with drugs. Ovartaci was committed to the Risskov psychiatric hospital in 1929. She then had a sex change operation in 1957. She lived and worked in the institution for fifty-six years. In 1972 Ovartaci decided not to identify as a woman and started identifying as a man until his death in 1985.

Ovartaci's phantasmagoric work features numerous female and animal figures set within an abundance of symbols, interiors, and landscapes. These figures are invested with a sense of identification that seems to defy the divide between real life and the realm of art. In 2018 an expansive exhibition entitled "Ovartaci and the Art of Madness" included a survey of the artist's work, as well as homages and related works by contemporary artists. His art can be seen at Museum Ovartaci in Aarhus, Denmark, a museum named after him showcasing artwork created at the psychiatric hospital in Risskov, Denmark.

In 2022, a monograph on Ovartaci's life, work and production was released: Ovartaci: The Signature of Madness.

References

20th-century Danish artists
1894 births
1985 deaths
Transgender artists
Transgender women
Danish transgender people
20th-century Danish LGBT people